Haplochromis obliquidens is an African species of cichlid found in Lake Victoria and the adjacent reaches of the Nile. Another species sometimes seen in the aquarium trade, Haplochromis latifasciatus of the Lake Kyoga system, is frequently labelled as Haplochromis "zebra obliquidens", which sometimes cause confusion between the species. Unlike that species, H. obliquidens is not known from the aquarium trade.

References

obliquidens
Fish described in 1888
Taxonomy articles created by Polbot